Foster & Lloyd is an American country music duo consisting of singer-songwriters  Radney Foster and Bill Lloyd. After pairing up in 1986, the duo recorded three albums for RCA Nashville, charting nine singles on the Billboard country charts. The highest-peaking of these was their debut single  "Crazy Over You", a No. 4 hit in 1987. After disbanding in 1990, Foster and Lloyd began solo careers. They reunited in 2010 to release a fourth studio album.

Description and history
The tandem consists of Radney Foster (lead vocals, rhythm guitar) and Bill Lloyd (harmony and occasional lead vocals, lead and rhythm guitars). 

They met while employed at MTM publishing in Nashville. They co-wrote the country hit "Since I Found You" in 1986 for Sweethearts of the Rodeo before obtaining their own record deal. Their self-titled debut LP produced five hit singles on the U.S. Billboard country music charts. Follow-up albums, Faster & Llouder (1989) and Version of the Truth (1990) were less successful. After the third record, they parted ways and embarked on solo careers. They reunited in 2010 and released a fourth studio album in May 2011.

In 1987, while still a member of the duo, Lloyd released his debut solo album, Feeling the Elephant. The album's power pop style greatly differed from that of Foster & Lloyd, and was critically acclaimed but commercially unsuccessful. Following the disbanding of the group, Lloyd released a second album, Set to Pop.

Style
They were hailed by critics for their tasteful blend of popular country and rock and roll. Foster described their style "a country garage band" which is "harking back to what was best in music in the '50s and '60s and making it part of the '80s." Their musical style combined Foster's plainspoken lyrics with Lloyd's virtuoso guitar licks and power pop sensibilities.

Discography

Studio albums

Compilations

Singles

Guest singles

Music videos

References

External links
 Radney Foster's official web site
 Bill Lloyd's official web site
 Bill Lloyd Interview NAMM Oral History Library (2021)

Country music groups from Tennessee
Country music duos
Musical groups established in 1986
Musical groups disestablished in 1990
RCA Records Nashville artists
Musical groups reestablished in 2010
1986 establishments in Tennessee